WORO (92.5 FM), branded on-air as Oro 92.5, is a radio station that broadcasts in a Spanish-language easy listening radio format. It is owned by the Catholic Church. Licensed to Corozal, Puerto Rico, it serves the central-eastern Puerto Rico area. The station is owned by Grupo RTC, under its licensee Radio ORO/WORO-FM Trust Archdiocese of San Juan.

External links

ORO
Radio stations established in 1968
Catholic Church in Puerto Rico
1968 establishments in Puerto Rico
Corozal, Puerto Rico
Easy listening radio stations